John Osborne Austin (December 28, 1849 – October 27, 1918) was a genealogist who wrote and published several books, primarily on the families of Rhode Island. The work for which he is best known is the Genealogical Dictionary of Rhode Island, published in 1887.

Life 

Austin was the son of Samuel Austin and Elizabeth H. Osborne of Providence, Rhode Island.  He was married in 1878 to Helen Augusta Whitaker, and in 1880 he and his wife, with their infant daughter, Rosamond, lived in Providence in the household of his wife's mother, Mrs. William Whitaker. It was during the late 1880s that Austin published his most important works, including the Genealogical Dictionary of Rhode Island in 1887, The Ancestry of Thirty three Rhode Islanders in 1889, and The Ancestral Dictionary in 1891.

Later in life he published some genealogical romances and other works. He and his wife lived in Providence; they are buried with their two children in Swan Point Cemetery in Providence.

References

Further reading

  
 Albert T. Klyberg, "Foreword," in John Osborne Austin, The Genealogical Dictionary of Rhode Island (reprinted edition, Baltimore, 1969; originally published Albany, 1887), https://books.google.com/books?id=LA7ntaS11ocC
 Memoir of John Osborne Austin, Proceedings of the New England Historic Genealogical Society at the Annual Meeting, 5 February 1919, With Memoirs of Deceased Members, 1918 (Boston, 1919), pp. lviii-lix (https://hdl.handle.net/2027/umn.31951001920532x?urlappend=%3Bseq=1015)

External links 

Some of Austin's works available online
 "Philip and Philippa: A Genealogical Romance," blog post, 11 June 2010, https://acourseofsteadyreading.wordpress.com/tag/john-osborne-austin

1849 births
1918 deaths
American genealogists
Burials at Swan Point Cemetery
Writers from Providence, Rhode Island